Leafield Athletic L.F.C. is a women's football club based in Solihull, West Midlands, England. The team compete in the FA Women's National League, Division One Midlands. The club play home games at Dickens Heath Sports Club, in Earlswood. Leafield Athletic Ladies FC also have six other teams, offering football for girls and ladies from 8 years old upwards.

The team was promoted to the National League in 2019, following their 1–0 win over Goldenhill Wanderers.

Committee members
List of Leafield Athletic Ladies FC committee members for the 2019–2020 season

References

FA Women's National League teams
Football clubs in the West Midlands (county)
Solihull